MDAP is Methenmadinone acetate, a progestin medication.

MDAP may also refer to: 

 Major Defense Acquisition Program, a U.S. Department of Defense program within the Weapon Systems Acquisition Reform Act of 2009
 Mutual Defense Assistance Program